Monte Ramaceto is a mountain in Liguria, northern Italy, part of the Ligurian Apennines.

Hiking 
The mountain is accessible by off-road mountain paths and is crossed by the Alta Via dei Monti Liguri, a long-distance trail from Ventimiglia (province of Imperia) to Bolano (province of La Spezia).

Nature conservation 
The mountain and its surrounding area are part of a SIC (Site of Community Importance) called Monte Ramaceto (code: IT1331810 ).

References

Mountains of Liguria
One-thousanders of Italy
Natura 2000 in Italy
Mountains of the Apennines